The little Japanese horseshoe bat (Rhinolophus cornutus) is a species of bat in the family Rhinolophidae. It is found in Japan and possibly China. Its natural habitat is temperate forests. As of 2012, it had not yet been assessed for the IUCN Red List.

References

Rhinolophidae
Mammals described in 1835
Taxonomy articles created by Polbot
Bats of Asia
Taxa named by Coenraad Jacob Temminck
Taxobox binomials not recognized by IUCN